The Dominican Ambassador to the United States is in charge of the Dominican Republic's diplomatic mission to the United States. The official title is The Ambassador to the United States of America.

The ambassador's residence is on 1715 22nd Street, NW in Washington, D.C.

The current Ambassador, José Tomás Pérez, presented his credentials in February, 2015.

List of Ambassadors
Ambassadors of the Dominican Republic to the United States of America 1894–present
 Alejandro Woss y Gil (1894–1899)
 Emilio C. Joubert (1900)
 Francisco Leonte Vázquez (1901–1904)
 Juan Francisco Sánchez (1904)
 Emilio C. Joubert (1904–1908)
 Arturo L. Fiallo (1909)
 Emilio C. Joubert (1909–1911)
 Francisco J. Peynado (1912–1913)
 Eduardo R. Soler (1914)
 Enrique Jiménez (1915)
 A. Peréz Perdomo (1915–1917)
 Luis Galván (1917–1920)
 Emilio C. Joubert (1920–1924)
 Jóse del Carmen Ariza (1924–1926)
 Angel Morales (1926–1930)
 Rafael Brache (1930–1931)
 Roberto L. Despradel Pennell (1931–1934)
 Rafael Brache (1934–1935)
 Andrés Pastoriza (1935–1941)
 José María Troncoso (1941–1943)
 Anselmo Copello (1943–1944)
 Emilio García Godoy (1944–1947)
 Julio Ortega Frier (1947)
 Luis F. Thomen (1947–1953)
 Manuel A. de Moya (1953–1955)
 Joaquin E. Salazar (1955–1957)
 Manuel A. de Moya (1957–1959)
 Luis F. Thomen Candelario (1959–1961)
 Andrés Freites Barrera (1962–1963)
 Enriquillo del Rosario (1963)
 José A. Bonilla Atiles (1964–1965)
 Milton T. Messina Matos (1965–1966)
 Héctor García-Godoy (1966—1969)
 Mario Read Vittini (1969–1970)
 Salvador Ortiz (1970–1974)
 Horacio Vicioso Soto (1974–1978)
 Francisco Augusto Lora (1978–1979)
 Enriquillo del Rosario (1979–1981)
 José Rafael Molina Morillo (1981–1982)
 Carlos Despradel Roques (1982–1985)
 Eulogio José Santaella Ulloa (1985–1987)
 Eduardo A. León (1987–1989)
 Carlos Morales Troncoso (1989–1991)
 José del Carmen Ariza (1991–1996)
 Bernardo Vega (1997–1999)
 Roberto B. Saladín Selín (1999–2002)
 Hugo Guilliani Cury (2002–2004)
 Flavio Darío Espinal (2004–2009)
 Roberto Saladín (2009–2011)
 Aníbal de Castro (2011-2014)
José Tomás Pérez (2014–present)

References

External links
 Dominican Embassy in Washington

Dominican Republic
Listl
United States